Aqua Planet is a chain of public aquariums in South Korea. Aqua Planet Jeju is so far South Korea's largest aquarium.

Branches

References

External links

Aquaria in South Korea
Hanwha subsidiaries